is a Japanese manga series written and illustrated by Jirō Gyū. It was serialized in the Akita Shoten magazine Weekly Shōnen Champion from 1982 to 1985. An anime television series adaptation was broadcast from 1983 to 1984.

Overview
The story is about a young boy named Sanshiro Sugata and his miniature PlaWrestler pocket robot with super LSI circuit named Juohmaru. Initially, the show was about Sanshiro's battles with Juohmaru against other PlaWrestlers in robot battle tournaments that were a hybrid blend of modern professional wrestling, hi-tech robot wars and Japanese noh theatre. As the series went on, its focus shifted to Sanshiro exploring the possible uses of PlaWrestling technology in medical implants, and his clash against those who wished to use it for military purposes instead.

Characters

Sanshiro's group
    
Sanshiro is the series' protagonist and a PlaWres modeler. His PlaWrestler, Juohmaru (柔王丸 Jūōmaru), is custom-made. Initially, Sanshiro is an ambitious rookie, and his overconfidence and brashness leads to several mistakes that he sometimes does not get out of. As the series, progresses, Sanshiro learns to think more rationally and consider the benefit of others rather than only his own.
    
Kyoko's is Sanshiro's friend and possible love interest. She is assistant judo instructor at the Sugata family dojo. She is energetic and outspoken and does not hesitate to scold Sanshiro whenever he makes a mistake. Kyoko works at her family's eatery business and can drive a motorcycle.
    
Shota is Sanshiro's best friend, whose job is collecting information of any kind, particularly on rival modelers. Shota is hyperactive and is shown frequently running in a peculiar style of his own invention. He is also flirtatious, a loudmouth and quick to judge on first impressions. However, he takes his duties seriously.
    
Tetsuya is Juohmaru's mechanic, responsible for fine tuning him, upgrading him and repairing him, especially during the minute-long break between a battle's rounds. He is shown to be very capable, a quick thinker and an innovator, although at times he has taken offence at Sanshiro overriding him for Juohmaru's maintenance.
    
Shinji is Juohmaru's programmer. His code, along with Sanshiro's manual control, guides Juohmaru in the battle ring. Like Tetsuya, Shinji is portrayed to be good at his job and a cool thinker compared to Sanshiro and Shota.

Sanshiro's family
    
Sanshiro's grandfather and judo master of the local dojo. For the most part, Kennosuke is critical of Sanshiro's PlaWrestling exploits, preferring him to practice judo and eventually succeed him as dojo master instead. However, he is also shown secretly watching many of Sanshiro's fights and worrying about the outcome. Eventually, Sanshiro's success and determination convince Kennosuke to let him pursue his own dreams.
    
Sanshiro's mother. Kaoru seems to be somewhat aloof, which makes her a foil for Kennosuke when discussing about Sanshiro. Despite her impression of naivety, she occasionally exhibits moments of profound insight in a situation, attributing them to her "maternal instinct".
    
Sanshiro's little sister. Machiko is a lively child who supports Sanshiro in his endeavours. Despite her small age, she is prone to making surprisingly insightful remarks to many of her elders.
 
Sanshiro's father. Kenichiro died before the series begins and appears only in his photograph and Sanshiro's imagination. Kenichiro's research created PlaWrestling. His further attempts to use it for the benefit of mankind met with resistance from arms dealers who wished to use it as a means of warfare. Kenichiro ended up dead in a suspicious accident. After learning this, Sanshiro resolved to use PlaWrestling to continue his father's research, which was a pivotal moment in the series.

Antagonists
 José Garcia
The mastermind behind all the plans directed against Sanshiro. José Garcia is a ruthless arms dealer who manipulates the PlaWrestling scene worldwide by funding and essentially bribing its officials. In this way, he hopes to exploit PlaWrestling technology to develop robotic super-soldiers. It is possible that he orchestrated the accident in which Sanshiro's father died. Somewhat atypically, Garcia is not defeated by the end of the series. He actually manages to develop and market robot soldiers of questionable competence, and Sanshiro believes in allowing the world to judge for itself whether the peaceful or aggressive use of PlaWrestling technology is more useful.
 Ballesteros
Chairman of the World PlaWresting Association (WPWA) and henchman to José Garcia. Ballesteros is a self-important man who manipulates the Association, its Japanese branch (JPWA) and the Fighting-type Modeler League to further Garcia's ends. After Garcia develops his robot soldiers, he loses interest in PlaWrestling and cuts funding, leading an enraged Ballesteros to face off against Sanshiro in the series finale. Like Garcia, Ballesteros suffers no consequences for his villainous actions besides feeling defeated and humiliated.
    
An enigmatic, beautiful woman riding a motorbike, Shiela spies on Sanshiro from the first episode and constantly manipulates events and people to force him to give up PlaWrestling. Eventually it is revealed that she works for José Garcia, who has convinced her that he will heal her brother's Mash's legs, who were disabled when Garcia's car crashed into Sheila's motorbike. After she realises Garcia's deception, Sheila becomes an ally of Sanshiro. She also has an unnamed female PlaWrestler.
    
Boisterous and self-important, Kurosaki is Japan's national PlaWrestling champion for three consecutive years. However, he loses from Sanshiro in the first episode, partly due to damage his PlaWrestler, Mad Hurricane, sustained during the championship match. This event makes Kurosaki a fierce rival of Sanshiro, and they clash for most of the series. Later on, Kurosaki becomes more sympathetic after seeing the troubles Sanshiro has to overcome and ends up his ally. Kurosaki is the region's foremost Fighting-Type modeler, following the philosophy of winning at any cost.

Other characters
    
In contrast with Kurosaki, Narita is the region's foremost Hobby-type modeler. Hobby-types generally view PlaWrestling as a contest of skill and place the well-being of their PlaWrestlers above winning. Narita is down-to-earth, intelligent, collected and has the respect of Sanshiro and his team, but his attitude sometimes makes him take things too seriously and appear cold and distant. Narita's PlaWrestler is called Ikaros Wing.
 Dr. Warmer
A colleague of Sanshiro's father, Dr. Warmer helped develop PlaWrestling technology. After telling Sanshiro of his father's desire to use PlaWrestling to help the disabled, Sanshiro gathers data from Juohmaru's battles and send them to him. Dr. Warmer analyses this data and eventually comes up with a novel technology that relies on brain wave induction to restore a person's mobility.

DVD release
Six Plawres Sanshiro DVDs are available spanning 37 episodes at 25 minutes each.

Plawres Sanshiro Vol.1 – Episode 1,2

Plawres Sanshiro Vol.2 – Episode 3 - 9

Plawres Sanshiro Vol.3 – Episode 10 - 16

Plawres Sanshiro Vol.4 – Episode 17 - 23

Plawres Sanshiro Vol.5 – Episode 24 - 30

Plawres Sanshiro Vol.6 – Episode 31 - 37

Episodes

External links

1982 manga
1983 anime television series debuts
Akita Shoten manga
Shōnen manga
Wrestling in anime and manga
Fictional martial sports in anime and manga